Duke Aimone can refer to:

 Prince Aimone, Duke of Aosta, Italian nobleman and naval officer
 Prince Aimone, Duke of Apulia, Italian nobleman, current heir apparent to the disputed headship of the House of Savoy